The Intercept is an American non-profit news organization founded by Glenn Greenwald, Jeremy Scahill, and Laura Poitras, and funded by eBay co-founder Pierre Omidyar. Its editor is Betsy Reed. It also publishes four podcasts: Intercepted (hosted by Jeremy Scahill), Deconstructed, Murderville GA, and Somebody.

The Intercept has published in English since its founding, and in Portuguese since the 2016 launch of the Brazilian edition staffed by a local team of Brazilian journalists.

History
The Intercept was founded by journalists Glenn Greenwald and Jeremy Scahill and filmmaker Laura Poitras. It was launched in February 2014 by First Look Media, which is funded by billionaire eBay founder Pierre Omidyar. The publication initially reported on documents released by Edward Snowden. Co-founders Greenwald and Poitras subsequently left amid public disagreements about the leadership and direction of the organization.

Awards
In February 2016, The Intercept won a National Magazine Award for columns and commentary by the writer Barrett Brown, and it was a finalist in the public interest category for a series by Sharon Lerner called the Teflon Toxin, which exposed how DuPont harmed the public and its workers with toxic chemicals. In April 2016, The Intercept won the People's Voice award for best news website at the twentieth annual Webby Awards. In May 2016, The Intercept won three awards at the New York Press Club Awards for Journalism. The site was awarded in the "special event reporting" category for its investigative reporting on the U.S. drone program, the "humor" category for a series of columns by the writer Barrett Brown, and the "documentary" category for a short film called, "The Surrender"—about the former U.S. intelligence analyst Stephen Jin-Woo Kim—produced by Stephen Maing, Laura Poitras, and Peter Maass. At the September 2016 Online News Awards, The Intercept won the University of Florida Award in Investigative Data Journalism for its Drone Papers series, an investigation of secret documents detailing a covert U.S. military overseas assassination program.

At the 2017 Online News Awards, The Intercept won two awards: the first for a feature story about the FBI's efforts to infiltrate the Bundy family, and the second, an investigative data journalism award for "Trial and Terror", a project documenting the people prosecuted in the U.S. for terrorism since 9/11. The same year, The Intercept won a Hillman Prize for Web Journalism for an investigative series by Jamie Kalven exposing criminality within the Chicago Police Department. The news organization also won a 2017 award for "Outstanding Feature Story" at the sixteenth annual Awards for Reporting on the Environment. Judges of the environmental award praised author Sharon Lerner for her piece "The Strange Case of Tennie White", which they described as a "finely written and disturbing investigation of contamination and injustice near a chemical plant in Mississippi".

U.S. government reaction
In August 2014, it was reported that members of the U.S. military had been banned from reading The Intercept.

Controversies
Erik Wemple, writing for The Washington Post, noted the conspicuous refusal of The Intercept to use the term "targeted killings" to refer to the U.S. drone program, instead referring to the drone strikes as "assassinations". Wemple included Glenn Greenwald's explanation that assassination is "the accurate term rather than the euphemistic term that the government wants us to use"; Greenwald further noted that "anyone who is murdered deliberately away from a battlefield for political purposes is being assassinated". TechCrunch referred to the story as clear evidence of "unabashed opposition to security hawks".

The Jewish Telegraph Agency wrote that The Intercepts founder "has relentlessly criticized Israel and its political leadership, and at times has invoked tropes of dual loyalty in attacking the pro-Israel community". The site also published a podcast titled "The case against AIPAC".

Politico notes that The Intercept has a tendency to write articles that speak negatively of Democrats.

Juan M. Thompson scandal

In February 2016, the site appended lengthy corrections to five stories by reporter Juan M. Thompson and retracted a sixth, about Charleston church shooter Dylann Roof, written over the previous year, focused on the African-American community. Shortly afterward, a note from editor Betsy Reed indicated that Thompson had been fired recently after his editors discovered "a pattern of deception" in his reporting. According to Reed, he had "fabricated several quotes in his stories and created fake email accounts that he used to impersonate people, one of which was a Gmail account in my name".

Reed apologized to readers and to those misquoted. She noted that some of Thompson's work, most of it using public sources, was verifiable. Editors alerted any downstream users of the affected stories, and promised to take similar action if further fabrication came to light.

Thompson suggested that the greater problem was racism in the media field. He had made up pseudonyms for some of his sources, whom he described as "poor black people who didn't want their names in the public given the situations" and would not have spoken with a reporter otherwise. "[T]he journalism that covers the experiences of poor black folk and the journalism others, such as you and First Look, are used to differs drastically," he argued. He also said he had felt a need to "exaggerate my personal shit in order to prove my worth" at The Intercept given incidents of racial bias he said he had witnessed there. When Gawker published his email, Reed said those allegations had not been in the version he sent her.

He was fired by The Intercept in early 2016 and, according to Reed, did not cooperate with the investigation into his actions.

Reality Winner controversy

In early June 2017, The Intercept published a National Security Agency document that asserts Russian intelligence successfully hacked an American voter registration and poll software company, and used information culled to phish state election officials. The document was mailed from a source inside NSA, who did not reveal their identity to Intercept writers. One hour after publication, Reality Winner, a 25-year-old NSA contract employee, was arrested by the Federal Bureau of Investigation and charged under the Espionage Act of 1917. The article bolstered public suspicion that Russia interfered in the 2016 election.

The document states that Russian intelligence attempted to crack the log-in information of the employees of a vendor providing voter registration software and databases for states to use with their election systems. It stated that the Russians were successful enough that they were able to email 122 election officials, by posing as employees of the vendor.

According to David Folkenflik of National Public Radio, "[a]n Intercept reporter shared a photo of the papers with a source, a government contractor whom he trusted, seeking to validate it. The printout included a postmark of Augusta, Ga., and microdots, a kind of computerized fingerprint. The contractor told his bosses, who informed the FBI." NSA quickly identified the leaker of the documents.

Verifying the legitimacy of leaked documents is common journalism practice, as is protecting third parties who may be harmed incidentally by the leak being published. However, professional media outlets who receive documents or recordings from confidential sources do not, as a practice, share the unfiltered primary evidence with a federal agency for review or verification, as it is known that metadata and unique identifiers may be revealed that were not obvious to the journalist, and the source exposed.

According to the FBI, the evidence chain led to the arrest of Winner, a young Air Force veteran who was working in Georgia for Pluribus International Corporation, an NSA contractor, when the document was mailed to The Intercept. The Intercept has been criticized for unprofessional handling of the document, and indifference to the source's safety.

Following the arrest of Winner, The Intercept released a statement saying it had "no knowledge of the identity of the person who provided us with the document". Allegations from the FBI about Winner, it added, were "unproven assertions and speculation designed to serve the government's agenda and as such warrant skepticism".

NSA whistleblower John Kiriakou and Guantanamo Bay detention camp whistleblower Joseph Hickman have both accused the same reporter accused of revealing Winner's identity, Matthew Cole, of playing a role in their exposure, which, in Kiriakou's case, led to his imprisonment.

On July 11, 2017, The Intercept announced that its parent company, First Look Media, through its Press Freedom Defense Fund, would provide $50,000 in matching funds to Stand with Reality, a crowd-funding campaign to support Winner's legal defense, plus a separate grant to engage a second law firm to assist Winner's principal attorneys, Augusta-based Bell & Brigham. Additionally, wrote editor-in-chief Betsy Reed, "First Look's counsel Baruch Weiss of the firm Arnold & Porter Kaye Scholer may support the defense efforts while continuing to represent First Look's interests."

On August 23, 2018, at a federal court in Georgia, Winner was sentenced to the agreed-upon five years and three months in prison for violating the Espionage Act. Prosecutors said her sentence was the longest ever imposed in federal court for an unauthorized release of government information to the media. Winner was being held at the Federal Bureau of Prisons (FBOP)'s Federal Medical Center, Carswell in Fort Worth, Texas, in order to receive treatment for bulimia and be close to her family.

On November 30, 2020, Laura Poitras, one of the founding editors of The Intercept, left the company. She said she was fired in relation to the Winner controversy.

Resignation of Glenn Greenwald

On October29, 2020, Glenn Greenwald resigned from The Intercept, saying that he faced political censorship and contractual breaches from the editors, who he wrote had prevented him from reporting on the conduct of Joe Biden and his son, Hunter, with regard to China and Ukraine. On The Joe Rogan Experience, Greenwald stated that he thinks his colleagues did not want to report anything negative about Joe Biden because they were desperate for Trump to lose. The Intercept disputed Greenwald's accusations, writing that he "believes that anyone who disagrees with him is corrupt, and anyone who presumes to edit his words is a censor", and told The Washington Post, "it is absolutely not true that Glenn Greenwald was asked to remove all sections critical of Joe Biden from his article. He was asked to support his claims and innuendo about corrupt actions by Joe Biden with evidence."

Use of leaked data to solicit donations 
In May 2021, The Intercept used GabLeaks to solicit donations. Greenwald criticized the publication for exploiting what he called an invasion of privacy, which he said contrasted with The Intercept's origins during the Snowden leaks. In response, a spokesperson for The Intercept said that "We do not apologize for our interest in reporting on fascist activity."

Sam Bankman-Fried grant money received
In November 2022, it was reported that The Intercept received grant funds from Sam Bankman-Fried—founder of the bankrupt cryptocurrency exchange FTX—Bankman-Fried was reported to have given funds mostly to left-leaning causes or media outlets in an attempt to curry favor.

Podcasts

Intercepted 

Intercepted is a weekly podcast hosted by investigative journalist Jeremy Scahill and produced by First Look Media. The podcast uses interviews, round table discussions, and journalistic narrative to present investigative reporting, analysis, and commentary on topics such as war, national security, the media, the environment, criminal justice, government, and politics. Launched on January 25, 2017, the show often includes discussion with other writers, reporters, artists, and thinkers. It regularly featured The Intercept editor and journalist Glenn Greenwald as well as senior correspondent, author, and journalist Naomi Klein. The editor-in-chief is Betsy Reed. Music for the show is created and performed by DJ Spooky.

The premiere episode, on January 25, 2017, "The Clock Strikes Thirteen, Donald Trump is President" features an interview with Seymour Hersh, who criticizes the media's response to the alleged Russian hacking of the 2016 U.S. presidential election, calling the way the media went along with the story, "outrageous".

Deconstructed 
Deconstructed is a podcast hosted by The Intercepts Washington, D.C. bureau chief Ryan Grim. The show was previously hosted by British political journalist and broadcaster Mehdi Hasan for its first two years, from 2018 to 2020. Grim took over as permanent host in October 2020 when Hasan began hosting a news broadcast for Peacock.

Murderville, GA 
Murderville, GA is hosted by Liliana Segura and Jordan Smith, who cover a series of murders in a small Georgia town and the law enforcement investigation surrounding them.

Somebody 
Somebody is a podcast about a gunshot victim, Courtney Copeland, found outside a Chicago Police station, and the controversy around the official narrative.

American ISIS 
American ISIS is a podcast hosted by journalist Trevor Aaronson about the life of Russell Dennison, an American convert to Islam that fought and died for the Islamic State of Iraq and the Levant. Aaronson interviewed Dennison in secret for the last two years of the latter's life.

The Intercept Brasil 
In August 2016, The Intercept launched a Brazilian version, The Intercept Brasil, edited in Portuguese, aimed at Brazilian political news, and produced by a team of Brazilian journalists. The Intercept Brasil also features translated news from the English edition.

In June 2019, The Intercept Brasil released leaked Telegram messages exchanged between judge Sérgio Moro, prosecutor Deltan Dallagnol and other Operation Car Wash prosecutors. In the wake of the reporting, the Brazilian government in January 2020 indicted Glenn Greenwald on cybercrimes charges in connection with his efforts to protect his sources, the legitimacy of President Jair Bolsonaro's election was called into question, and the Supreme Federal Court of Brazil in April–June 2021 annulled former President Luiz Inácio Lula da Silva's 2018 conviction on corruption charges.

See also

References

Further reading

External links
 

2014 establishments in the United States
Internet properties established in 2014
Magazines established in 2014
News magazines published in the United States
American news websites
Online magazines published in the United States
Global surveillance
Intelligence websites
Investigative journalism
Tor onion services